Little Otik, also known as Greedy Guts, is a 2000 Czech surreal dark comedy horror film by Jan Švankmajer and Eva Švankmajerová. Based on the folktale Otesánek by Karel Jaromír Erben, the film is a comedic live action, stop motion-animated feature film set mainly in an apartment building in the Czech Republic.

The film uses the Overture to Der Freischütz (1821) by Carl Maria von Weber as the score.

Plot
Karel Horák (Jan Hartl) and Božena Horáková (Veronika Žilková) are a childless couple and for medical reasons are doomed to remain so. While on vacation with their neighbors, the Stadlers at a house in the country, Karel decides to buy the house at the suggestion of Mr. Stadler. When he is fixing up the house, he digs up a tree stump that looks vaguely like a baby. He spends the rest of the evening cleaning it up and then presents it to his wife. She names the stump Otík and starts to treat it like a real baby. She then works out a plan to fake her pregnancy and becoming more and more impatient she speeds up the process and 'gives birth' one month early.

Otík comes alive and has an insatiable appetite. Alžbětka (Kristina Adamcová), the Stadlers’ daughter, has been suspicious all along, and when she reads the fairy tale about Otesánek, the truth becomes clear to her. Meanwhile, little Otík has been just eating and growing. At one point he eats some of Božena's hair, and another day she returns home to find that Otík has eaten their cat. Karel and his wife are at odds with Karel pushing for killing the creature and Božena defending it as their child. The baby later consumes a postal worker (Gustav Vondráček) and then a social worker (Jitka Smutná).

The resulting deaths lead Karel to tie up and lock Otík away in the basement of their apartment building, leaving Otík to starve. Alžbětka secretly takes over as prime caretaker. She tries to keep Otík fed with normal human food, but, when her mother stops her, she is forced to drawing straws (matches in this case) to choose a person to feed to Otík. The chosen victim is an old man and pedophile, Mr. Žlábek (Zdeněk Kozák) who has been stalking her recently. Deciding she cannot take the stalking anymore, Alžbětka lures Mr. Žlábek to the basement where he gets entangled by Otik's vines and devoured. Karel himself later becomes a victim when he comes into the basement with a chainsaw but on seeing Otík he hesitates and calls him "son" before dropping the chainsaw. Afterwards, Božena goes into the basement and is heard screaming; having become a victim herself. In the end, Otík disobeys Alžbětka despite repeated warnings and eats all of Mrs. Správcová's (Dagmar Stříbrná) cabbage patch, prompting the old woman to take charge.

Ending
In the fairy tale upon which the movie is based, the old woman kills Otesánek by splitting his stomach open with a hoe; however, the film ends with her descending the stairs, Alžbětka reciting the end of the fairy tale tearfully; the audience is not allowed to witness the deed.

Cast
Veronika Žilková as Božena Horáková
Jan Hartl as Karel Horák
Kristina Adamcová as Alžbětka
Jaroslava Kretschmerová as Alžbětka's Mother
Pavel Nový as Alžbětka's Father
Dagmar Stríbrná as Pani spravcova (the caretaker)
Zdenek Kozák as Mr. Žlábek
Gustav Vondracek as Mládek, the Postman
Jitka Smutná as Bulanková, the Social worker

Reception

The site's critical consensus reads, "Though rather overlong, Little Otik is a whimsical, bizarre treat."

Little Otik was placed at 95 on Slant Magazine's best films of the 2000s.

Notes

External links
 

2000 films
2000 comedy-drama films
2000 comedy horror films
2000s pregnancy films
Czech animated films
2000s Czech-language films
Films about trees
Films based on fairy tales
Films based on works by Karel Jaromír Erben
Films directed by Jan Švankmajer
Films with live action and animation
2000s monster movies
2000s stop-motion animated films
Czech comedy horror films
British comedy-drama films
Czech black comedy films
British black comedy films
Films set in the Czech Republic
Films based on Slavic mythology
Czech Lion Awards winners (films)
Golden Kingfisher winners
2000 black comedy films
2000s British films
Czech animated comedy films
Czech animated horror films
Czech adult animated films
Czech monster movies